Nicholas Redfern (born 1964) is a British best-selling author, journalist, cryptozoologist and ufologist.

Redfern is an active advocate of official government disclosure of UFO information, and has worked to uncover thousands of pages of previously classified Royal Air Force, Air Ministry and Ministry of Defence files on unidentified flying objects (UFOs) dating from the Second World War from the Public Record Office and currently works as a feature writer and contributing editor for Phenomena magazine.

His 2005 book, Body Snatchers in the Desert: The Horrible Truth at the Heart of the Roswell Story, purports to show that the Roswell crash may have been military aircraft tests using Japanese POWs, suffering from progeria or radiation effects.

Biography
Redfern attended Pelsall Comprehensive School in Pelsall from 1976 to 1981.  He also worked at Dixons paint suppliers with another Ufologist Martin Lenton.

Redfern joined a rock music and fashion magazine Zero in 1981, where he trained in journalism, writing, magazine production and photography, later going on to write freelance articles on UFOs during the mid-1980s.

From 1984 until 2001 he worked as a freelance feature writer for the Daily Express, People, Western Daily Press and Express & Star newspapers, as well as a full-time feature writer for Planet on Sunday. Between 1996 and 2001 he worked as a freelance journalist for the British newsstand magazines The Weekender, Animals, Animals, Animals, Pet Reptile, Military Illustrated, Eye-Spy, The Unopened Files and The X-Factor.

Between 1996 and 2000 Redfern signed a three-book publishing deal with Simon & Schuster of London for the publication of A Covert Agenda: The British Government’s UFO Top Secrets Exposed (1997), The FBI Files: The FBI’s UFO Top Secrets Exposed (1998) and Cosmic Crashes: The Incredible Story of the UFOs That Fell to Earth (1999). These books were published in the United Kingdom, Canada, Russia, Poland, Australia, New Zealand and Portugal.

In 2003 Paraview-Pocket Books New York published Redfern's book Strange Secrets: Real Government Files on the Unknown in May of that year. And, in March 2004 Paraview-Pocket Books, New York, published his book Three Men Seeking Monsters: Six Weeks in Pursuit of Werewolves, Lake Monsters, Giant Cats, Ghostly Devil Dogs, and Ape-Men. This book tells the story of his relationship with Jonathan Downes and Richard Freeman of the Centre for Fortean Zoology, and has been optioned by Universal Studios though as of 2021 it has not been released. Redfern has run the U.S. branch of the Centre for Fortean Zoology since 2002.

Redfern works on the lecture circuit, both in the UK and overseas, and has appeared in internationally syndicated shows discussing the UFO phenomenon. Redfern is a regular on the History Channel programs Monster Quest and UFO Hunters, National Geographic Channels's Paranormal and the Syfy channel's Proof Positive, as well as appearing in an episode in the third season of Penn & Teller: Bullshit!, titled "Ghost Busters". He has also appeared on a variety of television programmes in the United Kingdom, including The Big Breakfast, Channel 5 News, and GMTV.

He has been identified as a member of an informal group of friends sometimes called the "Paranormal Rat Pack" and "The Cabal"; other members are filmmaker Paul Kimball, and author Greg Bishop; the late Mac Tonnies was also a member.

Bibliography
 A Covert Agenda: The British Government's UFO Top Secrets Exposed (1997) by Nick Redfern – 
 The F.B.I. Files (1998) by Nick Redfern – 
 Cosmic Crashes (1999) by Nick Redfern – 
 Strange Secrets (2003) by Nick Redfern and Andy J. Roberts – 
 Three Men Seeking Monsters (2004) by Nick Redfern – 
 Body Snatchers in the Desert: The Horrible Truth at the Heart of the Roswell Story (2005) by Nick Redfern – 
 On The Trail of the Saucer Spies (2006) by Nick Redfern – 
 Celebrity Secrets: Official Government Files on the Rich and Famous (2007) by Nick Redfern – 
 Man-Monkey – In Search of the British Bigfoot (2007) by Nick Redfern – 
 Memoirs of a Monster Hunter: A Five-Year Journey in Search of the Unknown (2007) by Nick Redfern – 
 THERE'S SOMETHING IN THE WOODS: A Transatlantic Hunt for Monsters and the Mysterious (2008) 
 Contactees: A History of Alien-Human Interaction (2009) by Nick Redfern – 
 FINAL EVENTS and the Secret Government Group on Demonic UFOs and the Afterlife (2010) - 
 The NASA Conspiracies (2011) by Nick Redfern – 
 The Real Men in Black (2011) by Nick Redfern – 
 Keep Out!: Top Secret Places Governments Don’t Want You to Know About (2011) - 
 The Pyramids and the Pentagon: The Government's Top Secret Pursuit of Mystical Relics, Ancient Astronauts, and Lost Civilizations (2012) - 
 The World's Weirdest Places (2012) - 
 Monster Files: A Look Inside Government Secrets and Classified Documents on Bizarre Creatures and Extraordinary Animals (2013) - 
 For Nobody's Eyes Only: Missing Government Files and Hidden Archives That Document the Truth Behind the Most Enduring Conspiracy Theories (2013) - 
 Close Encounters of the Fatal Kind: Suspicious Deaths, Mysterious Murders, and Bizarre Disappearances in UFO History (2014) - 
 The Zombie Book: Encyclopedia of the Living Dead (2014) by Nick Redfern and Brad Steiger – 
 Secret History: Conspiracies from Ancient Aliens to the New World Order (2015) - 
 The Bigfoot Book: The Encyclopedia of Sasquatch, Yeti and Cryptid Primates (2015) - 
 Bloodline of the Gods: Unravel the Mystery of the Human Blood Type to Reveal the Aliens Among Us (2015) - 
 Men in Black: Personal Stories & Eerie Adventures (2015) - 
 Woman In Black: The Creepy Companions of the Mysterious M.I.B. (2016) - 
 Weapons of the Gods: How Ancient Alien Civilizations Almost Destroyed the Earth (2016) - 
 The Monster Book: Creatures, Beasts and Fiends of Nature (The Real Unexplained! Collection) (2016) - 
 Immortality of the Gods: Legends, Mysteries, and the Alien Connection to Eternal Life (2016) -   
 365 Days of UFOs: A Year of Alien Encounters (2017) - 
 The Roswell UFO Conspiracy: Exposing A Shocking And Sinister Secret (2017) - 
 The New World Order Book (2017) - 
 The Slenderman Mysteries: An Internet Urban Legend Comes to Life (2018) - 
 Control: MKUltra, Chemtrails and the Conspiracy to Suppress the Masses (2018) - 
 The Black Diary: M.I.B, Women in Black, Black-Eyed Children, and Dangerous Books (2018) - 
 Chupacabra Road Trip: One Man’s Hunt for Vampires (2018) - 
 Paranormal Parasites: The Voracious Appetites of Soul-Sucking Supernatural Entities (2018) - 
 Top Secret Alien Abduction Files: What the Government Doesn't Want You to Know (2018) - 
 Cover-Ups & Secrets: The Complete Guide to Government Conspiracies, Manipulations & Deceptions (2019) – 
 Flying Saucers from the Kremlin: UFOs, Russian Meddling, Soviet Spies & Cold War Secrets (2019) - 
 The Alien Book: A Guide To Extraterrestrial Beings On Earth (The Real Unexplained! Collection) (2020) - 
 Assassinations: The Plots, Politics, and Powers behind History-Changing Murders (2020) - 
 The Rendlesham Forest UFO Conspiracy: A Close Encounter Exposed as a Top Secret Government Experiment (2020) - 
 Monsters of the Deep (The Real Unexplained! Collection) (2020) - 
 The Martians: Evidence of Life on the Red Planet (2020) - 
 Diary of Secrets: UFO Conspiracies and the Mysterious Death of Marilyn Monroe (2021) - 
 Time Travel: The Science and Science Fiction (The Real Unexplained! Collection) (2021) - 
 How Antigravity Built the Pyramids: The Mysterious Technology of Ancient Superstructures (2022) - 
 Runaway Science: True Stories of Raging Robots and Hi-Tech Horrors (The Real Unexplained! Collection) (2023) - 

In a 2002 interview, Redfern stated that "Andy Roberts and I have a book coming out next year on an alleged UFO crash incident in Wales in 1974." This relates to the Berwyn Mountain UFO incident.

See also
Rendlesham Forest Incident

References

External links
nickredfernfortean.blogspot.com, Redfern's main blog as of 2012
Nick Redfern's MySpace page
Nick Redfern's "There's Something in the Woods...", his cryptozoology blog
Nick Redfern's Celebrity Secrets

1964 births
Living people
British non-fiction writers
UFO writers
Roswell incident
People from Pelsall
Ufologists
Cryptozoologists
British male writers
Male non-fiction writers